Sverre Kråkenes (born 11 March 1931) is a Norwegian competition rower. He competed in the 1952 Summer Olympics and the 1960 Summer Olympics. His brothers Harald and Thorstein are also Olympic competition rowers.

References

External links

1931 births
Living people 
Norwegian male rowers
Olympic rowers of Norway
Rowers at the 1952 Summer Olympics
Rowers at the 1960 Summer Olympics
Sportspeople from Bergen